French Windows is the third solo album by Irish musician Sonny Condell. It was released in 1999 by Hummingbird Records.

Track listing

Personnel
Sonny Condell – guitar, vocals
Neil MacColl – electric & acoustic guitars
Simon Edwards – bass
Graham Henderson – synthesizer, organ, accordion, mandola, backing vocals
Roy Dodds – drums & percussion
Helen Boulding – backing vocals

Production
Graham Henderson – production
Jock Loveband – engineering
Cai Murphy – assistant engineer
Fionan Higgins – mastering at Digital Pigeon, Dublin
Red Dog – album design

Release history

References

1999 albums
Sonny Condell albums